Ahd 54, "Generation of '54", is a minor Algerian party led by human rights-activist Ali Fawzi Rebaine, who claims to have founded the first Algerian human rights organization. Its name is an allusion to the start of the Algerian War of Independence, in November 1954. In the 2007 election, it won 2.26% of the vote and two seats in the Algerian parliament.

Electoral history

Presidential elections

People's National Assembly elections

References

External links
 Ahd 54 website archive from 2010.

Political parties in Algeria